Barten may refer to:

Barten (surname), a surname
Bartians, an Old Prussian tribe
Barten, the German name for Barciany, a village in Kętrzyn County, Warmian-Masurian Voivodeship, Poland
Barten, the German name for Barty, Warmian-Masurian Voivodeship, a village in Iława County, Poland